Bästa vänner is a 1997 album from Swedish pop singer Lena Philipsson. This album is a soul pop album.

Track listing
All songs composed by Philipsson.
"Ingenting att va rädd för"
"Tänk om jag aldrig mer"
"Av och på"
"Kvinnan jag vet han vill ha"
"Bästa vänner"
"[outro]"
"Måndag tisdag"
"Vi ses igen framöver"
"[intro]"
"En annan man"
"Havet"

Contributing musicians
Lena Philipsson - keyboards, grand piano, vocals, percussion
Mattias Torell - guitar
Martin Jonsson - drums
Lounge - programming

References

1997 albums
Lena Philipsson albums